reQall  debuted in 2007 as an app that intelligently organized your spoken voice notes winning a DEMOgod award. Their first app was a voice-enabled personal productivity software program that integrates phone, email, text messaging and IM into a mobile memory aid. The software was available as a web-based application or as a download for the Apple iPhone, Android or the RIM BlackBerry smartphone. It was available in free and paid versions.

reQall was recognized as one of the top 25 ideas from MIT Media Lab over the past 25 years and is based on the Phd research work of Sunil Vemuri. Focused on how mobile technology could be used to help people capture their daily experiences and then efficiently catalog that information so that it could be retrieved and used at a later time.

In March 2009, the company introduced a new version of reQall that includes a patent-pending “Memory Jogger” that analyzes various aspects of the user’s current situation (time, location and upcoming calendar events) to provide a dynamically updated display of relevant to-dos and notes. The Memory Jogger proactively provides contextually-relevant reminders rather than relying on the user to seek information by accessing a static to-do list or calendar.

In 2014, reQall has forayed into bringing assistance to a range of devices such as Sony SmartWatch, Pebble, Toq, Google Glass, Samsung Gear and Gear Fit.. reqallable automatically determines and prioritizes messages from all of your most important contacts based on your calendar, communications, activity and location. When you’ve scheduled a meeting, reqallable will alert you to messages from participants, temporarily elevating those contacts to VIP status while holding back other, less-critical messages until the meeting has finished. When a message arrives, reqallable parses emails and texts to present only the most crucial details, and even offers the ability to answer via voice or to tap a quick reply for a prompt response.

reQall is a venture-backed company based in NASA's Silicon Valley research park.

Sometime in September 2015 the ReQall brand was taken over by Zeroin. The ReQall app no longer functions and data stored in the ReQall mobile application has been lost. Attempts to log in or find a remnant of the previous account in the new site result in no response of functionality.

References  

Personal digital assistants